The British Lawnmower Museum is a museum dedicated to the history of the lawnmowers in Southport, Merseyside, northern England.

The museum has over 300 restored exhibits of garden machinery from over the last 200 years, as well as a collection of lawnmowers previously owned by famous people including Prince Charles and Princess Diana, guitarist Brian May, performer and presenter Paul O'Grady, and Coronation Street actress Jean Alexander, who lived in Southport for many years. The museum has workshops that restore lawnmowers for the collection and others around the world. The collection includes patents and blueprints dating from 1799.

Trivia
The museum was mentioned in an episode of Would I Lie to You? in 2012. Southport–born comedian Lee Mack claimed that he had donated a dibber to the museum, which was true and can still be seen on display at the British Lawnmower Museum. In the same segment, Richard Bacon mentioned that he had donated a trowel to the museum.

References

External links
 British Lawnmower Museum website

Museums in Merseyside
Buildings and structures in Southport
Technology museums in the United Kingdom
Lawn mowers
Gardening in England